Acromelanism is a genetically determined, temperature-dependent pigmentation pattern, with full expression only occurring on legs, ears, tail and face. It is seen in Siamese and Himalayan cats, rats, rabbits, and some other animals such as birds.

References

Disturbances of human pigmentation